The 1984 United States presidential election in Florida took place on November 6, 1984. All fifty states and the District of Columbia were part of the 1984 United States presidential election. Florida voters chose 21 electors to the Electoral College, which selected the president and vice president of the United States.

Florida was won by incumbent United States President Ronald Reagan of California, who was running against former Vice President Walter Mondale of Minnesota. Reagan ran for a second time with former C.I.A. Director George H. W. Bush of Texas, and Mondale ran with Representative Geraldine Ferraro of New York, the first major female candidate for the vice presidency.

The presidential election of 1984 was a very partisan election for Florida, with nearly 100% of the electorate voting either Democratic or Republican, with only those two parties appearing on the presidential ballot in Florida. Every county gave either Reagan or Mondale an outright majority; all but one gave Reagan a majority. Only the Black Belt county of Gadsden gave Mondale a majority. In this election, Florida voted 7% more Republican than the national average.

Reagan won Florida in a 30.7% landslide, carrying all but one of the Sunshine State's counties. His vote share of 65.32% made it his 11th-best state, and his best state amongst those that had belonged to the Confederacy, amongst those that had voted for Carter in 1976, and amongst those that had at least 10 electoral votes. Reagan performed powerfully throughout both Florida's population centers as well as its rural areas. He won each of Dade, Broward, Pinellas, Palm Beach, Hillsborough, Duval, and Orange Counties by double digits; of these seven, he went below 60% only in Dade and Broward. Mondale collapsed in the rural Southern counties that had put Carter over the top in 1976 and many of which had stuck with the incumbent in 1980; even in 1980, for example, Carter was able to get over 60% of the vote in rural Dixie County, but Mondale sank to 35.7%. A similar process played out in Calhoun, Gilchrist, Lafayette, Levy, Gulf, and Liberty Counties, all of which Carter won by double digits in 1980, and in all of which Mondale sank below 40% (with similar swings away from Mondale occurring in other, similar counties which Carter had won more narrowly, or lost narrowly in 1980 after carrying in 1976). And Southwest Florida, which had turned Republican in the late 1940s and early 1950s and proved resistant to Carter's appeal in 1976, once again turned out powerfully for the Republican nominee: Reagan broke 70% in all of Manatee, Sarasota, Charlotte, Lee, and Collier Counties.

There were few positive signs for Mondale or the Democratic Party in the returns from Florida. Dade and--apart from its vote for Goldwater in 1964--Duval had been Democratic-leaning counties. But not only did both vote for Reagan by double digits, but they both also voted more Republican than the nation (Dade barely so, giving Reagan an 18.3% margin as compared to his 18.2% national margin). Perhaps the only sign of a positive trend for the Democratic Party was that Reagan barely increased his vote share in Broward County, which voted somewhat more Democratic than the nation; Broward had been a Republican stronghold, voting Republican in seven straight elections (including for Goldwater in 1964) before narrowly voting for Carter in 1976. In 1980, it seemed to snap back to its Republican ways, giving Reagan a substantially larger margin and vote share than he got nationally. But his 56.6% showing in the county in 1984 contrasted alarmingly with Nixon's 72.4% in his 1972 landslide. Nevertheless, in the run-up to the 1988 election, Florida was the only large state accounted assuredly safe for George H. W. Bush.

As of 2023, this is the last time that Florida voted to the right of South Carolina in a presidential election.

Democratic platform

Walter Mondale accepted the Democratic nomination for presidency after pulling narrowly ahead of Senator Gary Hart of Colorado and Rev. Jesse Jackson of Illinois - his main contenders during what would be a very contentious Democratic primary. During the campaign, Mondale was vocal about reduction of government spending, and, in particular, was vocal against heightened military spending on the nuclear arms race against the Soviet Union, which was reaching its peak on both sides in the early 1980s.

Taking a what was becoming the traditional liberal stance on the social issues of the day, Mondale advocated for gun control, the right to choose regarding abortion, and strongly opposed the repeal of laws regarding institutionalized prayer in public schools. He also criticized Reagan for his economic marginalization of the poor, stating that Reagan's reelection campaign was "a happy talk campaign," not focused on the real issues at hand.

A very significant political move during this election: the Democratic Party nominated Representative Geraldine Ferraro to run with Mondale as Vice-President. Ferraro is the first female candidate to receive such a nomination in United States history. She said in an interview at the 1984 Democratic National Convention that this action "opened a door which will never be closed again," speaking to the role of women in politics.

Republican platform

By 1984, Reagan was very popular with voters across the nation as the President who saw them out of the economic stagflation of the early and middle 1970's, and into a period of (relative) economic stability.

The economic success seen under Reagan was politically accomplished (principally) in two ways. The first was initiation of deep tax cuts for the wealthy, and the second was a wide-spectrum of tax cuts for crude oil production and refinement, namely, with the 1980 Windfall profits tax cuts. These policies were augmented with a call for heightened military spending, and the cutting of social welfare programs for the poor. Collectively called "Reaganomics", these economic policies were established through several pieces of legislation passed between 1980 and 1987.

Virtually unopposed during the Republican primaries, Reagan ran on a campaign of furthering his economic policies. Reagan vowed to continue his "war on drugs," passing sweeping legislation after the 1984 election in support of mandatory minimum sentences for drug possession.  Furthermore, taking a (what was becoming the traditional conservative) stance on the social issues of the day, Reagan strongly opposed legislation regarding comprehension of gay marriage, abortion, and (to a lesser extent) environmentalism, regarding the final as simply being bad for business.

Results

Results by county

See also
 Presidency of Ronald Reagan

References

Florida
1984
1984 Florida elections